Kim Hyong-sik is a North Korean politician. He is a member of the Central Committee of the Workers' Party of Korea and a member of the 12th convocation of the Supreme People's Assembly, North Korea's unicameral parliament.

Biography
In 2000, he served as the manager of the Shinchang Coal Mine, and in January 2005, he was appointed as the Minister of Electricity and Coal Industry. but was demoted to Deputy Minister in May. In October 2006, when the Ministry of Electricity and Coal Industry was separated into the Ministry of Electricity Industry and the Ministry of Coal Industry, it was revealed that he had been appointed Minister of Coal Industry in September 2007, serving until October 2011. In September 2010, following the 3rd WPK conference he was elected a member of the 6th Central Committee of the Workers' Party of Korea.

In April 2009 he was elected to the 12th convocation of the Supreme People's Assembly.

He served as a member of the funeral committee at the time of the death of Jo Myong-rok in 2010 and following the death of Kim Jong-il in 2011.

References

Members of the 12th Supreme People's Assembly
Government ministers of North Korea
Workers' Party of Korea politicians